Elachista nielspederi is a moth of the family Elachistidae that is found in Austria.

References

nielspederi
Moths described in 1992
Endemic fauna of Austria
Moths of Europe